Pentagramma is a small genus of North American ferns. Until 1990 members of this genus were included in Pityrogramma, and there has been considerable disagreement regarding the species' taxonomy. In the most recent treatment, six diploid species are recognized.

The distribution of P. triangularis (goldback fern) extends from British Columbia through the western United States into Baja California in northwestern Mexico. Pentagramma maxonii occurs in New Mexico, Arizona, Sonora, Baja California Sur, California, and Baja California. All other species are restricted to Californian and Baja California.

Members of the Pentagramma genus produce a powdery-waxy secretion on their lower leaf surfaces, called farina. This character is shared with the related Notholaena genus.

Species 
, the Checklist of Ferns and Lycophytes of the World recognized the following species:
Pentagramma glanduloviscida Schuettp. & Windham
Pentagramma maxonii (Weath.) Schuettp. & Windham
Pentagramma pallida (Weath.) Yatsk., Windham & E. Wollenw.
Pentagramma rebmanii (Winner & M. G. Simpson) Schuettp. & Windham
Pentagramma triangularis (Kaulf.) Yatsk., Windham & E. Wollenw.
Pentagramma viscosa (Nutt. ex D. C. Eaton) Schuettp. & Windham

References

External links
Jepson Manual Treatment
USDA Plants Profile: Pentagramma

Pteridaceae
Ferns of California
Fern genera